Warren Williams Jr. (born July 29, 1965) is a former professional American football running back.

Warren Williams played college football at the University of Miami.

College statistics
1984: 29 carries for 140 yards. 13 catches for 154 yards and 1 touchdown.
1985: 89 carries for 522 yards and 4 touchdowns. 14 catches for 131 yards.
1986: 80 carries for 399 yards and 3 touchdowns. 13 catches for 114 yards and 2 touchdowns.
1987: 135 carries for 673 yards and 5 touchdowns. 30 catches for 309 yards and 1 touchdown.

NFL career
Williams played in National Football League for the Pittsburgh Steelers (1988–1992) and the Indianapolis Colts.

References

1965 births
Living people
Sportspeople from Fort Myers, Florida
Players of American football from Florida
American football running backs
Miami Hurricanes football players
Pittsburgh Steelers players
Indianapolis Colts players